The Baptista de Andrade class were a class of four Portuguese designed corvettes, built for the Portuguese Navy by BAZAN in Spain in the 1970s. They are an updated version of the  - designed by the Portuguese naval engineer Rogério de Oliveira - with more modern armament and sensors.

Like the João Coutinho ships, the Baptista de Andrade corvettes were intended to operate in the Portuguese overseas territories. Allegedly, the ships would originally be intended to the South African Navy, the delivery being canceled after the Portuguese Carnation Revolution in 1974. After Portugal withdrew from its colonies, the four ships were due to be sold to the Colombian Navy in 1977 but the deal was not completed.

One ship, NRP Oliveira e Carmo, was decommissioned in 1999 and was officially scrapped on 1 November 2007 and later sunk as an artificial reef on 30 October 2012. NRP Afonso Cerqueira was decommissioned on 13 February 2015 and later sunk as an artificial reef off Madeira. Another ship was decommissioned in 2017 and the last one remains in limited service but will be retired and replaced by s.

Ships

References
Conway's All the World's Fighting Ships 1947-1995

Specific

 
Corvette classes
Portugal–Spain relations